Parydra aquila is a species of fly in the family Ephydridae. It is found in the Palearctic. 
Jizz Face brilliant green-black. Tarsi red brown, never black. Long. : 3,5–5 mm. May to December. By ponds.

References

External links
Images representing Parydra aquila at BOLD
images at EOL

Ephydridae
Insects described in 1813
Brachyceran flies of Europe